Saint-Marc-des-Carrières is a town in Quebec, Canada, part of Portneuf Regional County Municipality in the Capitale-Nationale region.

The place has earned the title of Rock Capital of Portneuf County because of its rock quarries that have played a significant role in the local economy. Even its name makes reference to these quarries (carrière means "quarry").

History
Since the early 19th century, the area has been known for its quarries of Trenton Limestone, that was used for many construction projects in that time period. The village, first known as Poiré, got its post office in 1863. By 1901, the place was called Châteauvert, in honour of Georges Châteauvert, who was postmaster, owner of the rock quarries, and first mayor from 1901 to 1903. That same year, the Parish of Saint-Marc-des-Carrières was formed by separating from Saint-Alban, Grondines, and Saint-Joseph-de-Deschambault. A year later, it became a civil parish. After 1911, the village was called by its parish name. In 1918, the place was incorporated as the Village Municipality of Saint-Marc-des-Carrières.

On June 12, 2004, Saint-Marc-des-Carrières gained city status.

Demographics 

Population trend:
 Population in 2011: 2862 (2006 to 2011 population change: 3.2%)
 Population in 2006: 2774
 Population in 2001: 2855
 Population in 1996: 2955
 Population in 1991: 2844

Mother tongue:
 English as first language: 0.4%
 French as first language: 98.3%
 English and French as first language: 0%
 Other as first language: 1.3%

Notable persons 
Jean-Louis Frenette : member of the House of Commons of Canada
 Chantal Petitclerc : paralympic athlete

References

Cities and towns in Quebec
Incorporated places in Capitale-Nationale
Portneuf Regional County Municipality